Freguesia de Nossa Senhora do Carmo is a civil parish in Macao Special Administrative Region. The major part of the freguesia is located in Taipa but it runs through to Hengqin Island in mainland China. The freguesia is named after the Igreja de Nossa Senhora do Carmo. It is the largest freguesia in Macau with an area of 7.9 square kilometers.

History and Geography
It is a common misconception that Freguesia de Nossa Senhora do Carmo equals Taipa. When Macau was still under the colonial rule of Portugal, there were no freguesias defined on the islands of Taipa and Coloane by the Portuguese Macau government, but the Diocese of Macau established the Paróquia de Nossa Senhora do Carmo (Our Lady of Mount Carmel Parish), covering Taipa Island. The delineation of the freguesia is later adopted by the government from the name of the existing parish. Several reclamations were carried out along the coast of Taipa Island through different periods; the freguesia now not just only includes the area of Taipa, but is further expanded to an island called , which houses the control tower of Macau International Airport. In 2013, the University of Macau was moved from Taipa to a new campus on Hengqin. The campus area applies Macau Law and is included in the freguesia, yet the island is owned by Zhuhai.

The southern boundary of the freguesia is the road of Estrada da Baía de Nossa Senhora da Esperança, the reclaimed land south of the road, although commonly treated as a part of Taipa, belongs to Zona do Aterro de Cotai and it does not belong to any part of Macau's freguesia.

See also
Our Lady of Carmel Church, Macau
Municipality of Ilhas

References

External links
Official site of the Catholic Diocese of Macau

Macau